Jaynagar may refer to:

 Jaynagar Majilpur, a town of the South 24 Parganas district in the Indian state of West Bengal
 Jaynagar Majilpur Municipality, a municipal corporation of the South 24 Parganas district in the Indian state of West Bengal
 Jaynagar Majilpur railway station, a railway station of the South 24 Parganas district in the Indian state of West Bengal
 Jaynagar I, a community development block of the South 24 Parganas district in the Indian state of West Bengal
 Jaynagar II, a community development block of the South 24 Parganas district in the Indian state of West Bengal
 Jaynagar (Vidhan Sabha constituency), a legislative assembly constituency of the South 24 Parganas district in the Indian state of West Bengal
 Jaynagar (Lok Sabha constituency), a parliamentary constituency of the South 24 Parganas district in the Indian state of West Bengal
 Jaynagar Institution, a government-sponsored high school of the South 24 Parganas district in the Indian state of West Bengal
 Jaynagarer Moa, a confectionery of the South 24 Parganas district in the Indian state of West Bengal
 Jaynagar, Bihar, a town of the Madhubani district in the Indian state of Bihar
 Jaynagar railway station, a railway station of the Madhubani district in the Indian state of Bihar
 Jaynagar–Patna Intercity Express, an express train in the Indian Railways
 Jaynagar–Ranchi Express, an express train in the Indian Railways
 Jaynagar–Anand Vihar Garib Rath Express, an express train in the Indian Railways
 Jaynagar–Lokmanya Tilak Terminus Antyodaya Express, an express train in the Indian Railways
 Jaynagar−Rajendra Nagar Terminal Intercity Express, an express train in the Indian Railways
 Jaynagar–Udhna Antyodaya Express, an express train in the Indian Railways
 Howrah–Jaynagar Passenger, an express train in the Indian Railways
 Kolkata–Jaynagar Weekly Express, an express train in the Indian Railways
 Puri–Jaynagar Express, an express train in the Indian Railways